Angiostrongylus is a genus of parasitic nematodes in the family Metastrongylidae.

Species 
Species in the genus
 Angiostrongylus cantonensis (Chen, 1935)
 Angiostrongylus costaricensis Morera & Cespedes, 1971
 Angiostrongylus vasorum Baillet, 1866

References 

Strongylida
Secernentea genera